O Nanna Nalle is a 2000 Indian Kannada-language film directed by V. Ravichandran and starring V. Ravichandran himself and Isha Koppikar. The film was Koppikar's Kannada film debut. The film is the Kannada remake of the Tamil film Thulladha Manamum Thullum (1999).

Cast
V. Ravichandran as Raja
Isha Koppikar as Ranganayaki /  Rangu 
Srinivasa Murthy
Sadhu Kokila
Bullet Prakash 
Myna chandru 
Mandeep Rai 
Bank Suresh 
Bank Janardhan 
Vijay Kashi 
Raj Surya 
Mandya Ramesh 
Karibasavaiah
Tanuja 
Chithra Shenoy 
Kishori Ballal 
Venkatesh Sharma 
Michael Madhu 
Vaijanath Biradar 
Ponnambalam
Suneetha Shetty

Soundtrack
Soundtrack was composed by V. Ravichandran. The song "Innisai Paadi Varum" from the original Tamil film was retained in this version as "Kanasugarana".
"Kanasugarana Ondu" (male) - S. P. Balasubrahmanyam
"Kanasugarana Ondu" (female) - K. S. Chitra
"Ee Preetige" -
"Rangu Rangena" -
"O Nanna Nalle" -
"Dudde Doddappa" -

References

External links
Movie preview

2000 films
2000s Kannada-language films
Indian romantic drama films
Kannada remakes of Tamil films
Films directed by V. Ravichandran
2000 romantic drama films
Films scored by V. Ravichandran